Public Conscription Organization of NAJA is an organization in Iran tasked to maintain information on those potentially subject to conscription, enroll and assign them to the Armed Forces of the Islamic Republic of Iran. The agency is a subdivision of Law Enforcement Command of Islamic Republic of Iran and is headed by Brigadier General Taghi Mehri.

References

External References links 
Website 
General rules of military service in Iran

Law Enforcement Command of Islamic Republic of Iran
Conscription by country